Devils Point is a point marking the southwest extremity of Byers Peninsula, Livingston Island in the South Shetland Islands, Antarctica and forming the southeast side of the entrance to Osogovo Bay and the west side of the entrance to Raskuporis Cove. The point is separated from Vardim Rocks to the south by Hell Gates. Lucifer Crags, a rocky bluff rising to 81 m at the south extremity of President Beaches, surmount Devils Point on the southwest, Acheron Lake on the northeast and Siren Lake on the east-southeast. The area was visited by early 19th century sealers.

The point was charted and named by James Weddell, Royal Navy, Master of the brig Jane, during the period 1820–23.

Location
British mapping in 1968, detailed Spanish mapping in 1992, and Bulgarian mapping in 2005 and 2009.

Maps
 Chart of South Shetland including Coronation Island, &c. from the exploration of the sloop Dove in the years 1821 and 1822 by George Powell Commander of the same. Scale ca. 1:200000. London: Laurie, 1822
 Península Byers, Isla Livingston. Mapa topográfico a escala 1:25000. Madrid: Servicio Geográfico del Ejército, 1992. (Map image on p. 55 of the linked study)
 L.L. Ivanov et al. Antarctica: Livingston Island and Greenwich Island, South Shetland Islands. Scale 1:100000 topographic map. Sofia: Antarctic Place-names Commission of Bulgaria, 2005.
 L.L. Ivanov. Antarctica: Livingston Island and Greenwich, Robert, Snow and Smith Islands. Scale 1:120000 topographic map.  Troyan: Manfred Wörner Foundation, 2009.

In fiction
 The Devils Point area is part of the mise-en-scène of the 2016 Antarctica thriller novel The Killing Ship by Simon Beaufort; the point is shown on a sketch map of Livingston Island illustrating the book.

Gallery

Notes

References
 Devils Point. SCAR Composite Antarctic Gazetteer

Headlands of Livingston Island